Science is a stand-up comedy show by British comedian Ricky Gervais. It was filmed in 2010 at the HMV Hammersmith Apollo, and released on DVD in November that year.

Reception
Science opened to little critical praise. Writing for The Independent, Julian Hall gave the show two stars out of five, stating that it was Gervais's "most disappointing" offering yet.

References

External links

2010 films
2010 comedy films
British comedy films
Stand-up comedy concert films
Stand-up comedy on DVD
Ricky Gervais
2010s British films